Club Atlético Tetuán was a Spanish football club based in Tétouan, Spanish protectorate of Morocco. The club played a single season in La Liga in 1951–52, after winning the Segunda División Southern Zone in 1950–51. This ended in relegation after finishing last of 16 teams.

Following Morocco's independence in 1956 the club's directors decided to merge the club with local club Sociedad Deportiva Ceuta (1932–1956), becoming Club Atlético de Ceuta and eventually merging into AD Ceuta. The club inherited Atlético Tetuán's federative rights and was legally Atlético Tetuán's successor. AD Ceuta dissolved in 2012.

Seasons

1 season in La Liga
6 seasons in Segunda División
5 seasons in Tercera División

See also
 AD Ceuta

References

Association football clubs established in 1922
Defunct football clubs in Spain
1922 establishments in Spain
1956 disestablishments in Spain
Association football clubs disestablished in 1956
Tétouan
Spanish Africa
History of Tétouan
Segunda División clubs
La Liga clubs